St. John's Priory may refer to:
St. John's Priory, Bergen, Norway
St. John's Priory, Kalmar, Sweden
St John's Priory, Trim, Ireland
St. John's Priory, Viborg, Denmark
St John's Priory, Wells, England